The FBMA Trophy is an annual figure skating competition held in January in Abu Dhabi, United Arab Emirates. It is the only figure skating competition in the Arab world included in the International Skating Union's calendar. Medals are awarded in men's and ladies' single skating at various levels, including senior and junior.

Technical scores received at this event count towards qualification for ISU Championships. In 2017, the senior ladies' category also counted toward World Rankings but the men's category did not, as it did not attract enough senior skaters from a range of countries.

Senior medalists

Men

Ladies

Junior medalists

Men

Ladies

Advanced novice medalists

Men

Ladies

References

External links 
 

Figure skating competitions
Sports competitions in Abu Dhabi
Figure skating in the United Arab Emirates